Contreras is a Spanish surname of toponymic origin, for "from the surrounding area". It is a common family name in the Hispanic-speaking world.

People
Adán Amezcua Contreras (born c. 1969), Mexican co-leader (with his two younger brothers) of the Colima Cartel
Alan Contreras (born 1956), American writer and ornithologist
Albert Contreras (1933–2017), American artist
Alejandro Contreras (born 1993), Chilean footballer
Alonso de Contreras (1582–1641), Spanish soldier, sailor, privateer, adventurer and writer
Ana Brenda Contreras (born 1986), Mexican-American singer and actress
Andrés Contreras (1943–2014), Chilean agronomist and potato expert
Anthony Contreras (born 2000), Costa Rican footballer 
Billy Contreras (born 1984), American jazz violinist and bluegrass fiddler
Carlos Contreras (disambiguation), several people with this name
Carme Contreras i Verdiales (1932–2020), Spanish actress
Carmen Contreras-Bozak (1919–2017), American who was the first Hispanic to serve in the U.S. Women's Army Corps
Cristián Contreras Molina (born 1946), Chilean disrobed Roman Catholic bishop
Diego de Contreras (1562–1618), Mexican Roman Catholic Archbishop
Dalia Contreras (born 1983), Venezuelan taekwondo athlete
Edgar Contreras (surgeon) (born 1961), Dominican doctor and plastic surgeon
Edgar Contreras (taekwondo) (born 1992), Venezuelan taekwondo athlete
Eleazar López Contreras (1883–1973), Venezuelan politician and former president
Elías Contreras (born 1997), Argentine footballer
Elsa Patricia Galarza Contreras (born 1963), Peruvian economist
Enrique Contreras III (born 1992), Mexican racing driver
Francisco Contreras (boxer) (born 1984), Dominican boxer
Gloria Contreras Roeniger (1934–2015), Mexican dancer and choreographer
Gustavo Lozano Contreras (1938–2000), Colombian botanist
Hidalgo Contreras (born 1969), Mexican politician
Iván Contreras (born 1974), Mexican volleyball player
Israel Contreras (born 1960), Venezuelan world champion boxer
Jesús Amezcua Contreras (born c. 1975), Mexican co-leader (with his two older brothers) of the Colima Cartel
Jesús Fructuoso Contreras (1866–1902), Mexican sculptor
José Contreras (disambiguation), several people
Joseph Contreras (1710–1782), Spanish maker of violins, known as 'Granadino'
Karel Espino Contreras (born 2001), Cuban football player
Karen Higuera Contreras (born 1991), Mexican beauty pageant titleholder
K-Réena (born Katherine Macarena Contreras Contreras in 1986), Chilean singer
Luis Amezcua Contreras (born c. 1974), Mexican co-leader (with his younger and older brother) of the Colima Cartel
Luis Contreras (disambiguation), several people
Manuel Contreras (1929–2015), Chilean head of intelligence during Pinochet's dictatorship
Mar Contreras (born 1981), Mexican actress and singer
Maria Contreras-Sweet (born 1955), Mexican-American administrator of the Small Business Administration
María José Rienda Contreras (born 1975), Spanish alpine skier
Mark Contreras (born 1995), American baseball player
Michael Contreras (born 1993), Chilean footballer
Miguel Contreras , American labor union leader
Narciso Contreras (born 1975), Mexican documentary photojournalist
Nardi Contreras (born 1951), American baseball player
Néstor Contreras (born 1979), Chilean footballer
Orlando Contreras (footballer) (born 1982), Peruvian footballer
Orlando Contreras (singer) (1930–1994), Cuban Bolero singer
Pablo Contreras (born 1978), Chilean football defender
Paulo Garcés (born 1984), Chilean football goalkeeper
Patricio Contreras (born 1947), Chilean actor
Pedro Contreras (born 1972), Spanish football goalkeeper
Pedro de Alvarado y Contreras (1485–1541), Spanish conquistador
Patricia Mejía Contreras (1958–2007), Mexican sculptor and graphic artist
Rey Paz Contreras (1950–2021), Filipino sculptor
Roberto Contreras (1928–2000), American actor, father of Luis (above)
Rodrigo Contreras (born 1995), Argentine footballer
Rudolph Contreras (born 1962), United States District Court judge
Salustiano Contreras (18??–19??), Cuban baseball player
Sebastián Contreras (born 1988), Chilean footballer
Sergio Contreras (born 1980), Mexican baseball player
Víctor Contreras (born 1941), Mexican field hockey player
Víctor Contreras (rower) (born 1961), Chilean rower
Víctor Contreras Ruíz (born 1980), Mexican organist and orchestral conductor
William Contreras (born 1997), Venezuelan baseball player
Willson Contreras (born 1992), Venezuelan baseball player
Wilson Contreras (born 1967), Chilean footballer
Yeferson Contreras (born 1999), Colombian footballer
Yelandy Contreras (born 1997), Dominican footballer
Yeny Contreras (born 1979), Chilean taekwondo athlete
Yidiel Contreras (born 1992), Spanish hurdler
Yuderqui Contreras (born 1986), Dominican weightlifter

See also
Battle of Contreras, during the Mexican–American War
Contreras, Province of Burgos, a municipality in Castile and León, Spain
Contreras Island, an island in deep southern Chile
Magdalena Contreras, borough of the Mexican Federal District

Surnames of Spanish origin